Thinagaran a/l Santhanathevan (born 5 January 1986) is a Malaysian professional footballer who plays as a right midfielder and sometimes as a right winger.

Club career

PKNS FC
Thinagaran signed with Selangor-based club, PKNS FC in 2016 season that compete in Malaysia Premier League.

Kelantan FA
On 20 January 2017, Thinagaran was confirmed signed with Kota Bharu based team, Kelantan FA one day before 2017 Malaysia Super League kick start. On 27 January 2017, he made his debut playing against PKNS FC when he replaced Nor Farhan at 66th minutes and play until the end of the game. Kelantan won 3–1.

Career statistics

Club

References

External links
S. Thinagaran at StadiumAstro.com

1986 births
Living people
Malaysian people of Indian descent
Tamil sportspeople
Malaysian footballers
Kelantan FA players
Malaysia Super League players
Association football midfielders